Love and Theft is an American country music duo consisting of vocalists Eric Gunderson and Stephen Barker Liles. They originally recorded as a trio with vocalist Brian Bandas; after he exited the band, Gunderson and Liles continued as a duo. Signed to Lyric Street Records subsidiary Carolwood Records in 2009, Love and Theft made their chart debut in early 2009 with the single "Runaway," which reached the Top 10 on Billboard Hot Country Songs. The band's debut album, World Wide Open, was released on August 25, 2009.

In 2011, following the departure of Bandas, Love and Theft continued as a duo consisting of Gunderson and Liles. The duo moved to RCA Records Nashville that year and released the single "Angel Eyes", which became their first number 1 single. It and the Top 40 singles "Runnin' Out of Air" and "If You Ever Get Lonely" all appear on their second, self-titled album. A third album, Whiskey on My Breath, followed in 2015.

Musical career
Love and Theft was formed in 2006 by Brian Bandas, Stephen Barker Liles, and Eric Gunderson, all three of whom alternated on lead vocals. After performing before ASCAP executives, they were recommended to an A&R executive for Lyric Street Records, who signed them to Lyric Street's sister label Carolwood Records in 2009. Just prior, they were also signed as an opening act for Taylor Swift's 2008 tour. Liles is the subject of "Hey Stephen" which appears on Swift's 2008 album Fearless. He also co-wrote the track "Wrong Baby Wrong Baby Wrong" on Martina McBride's 2009 album Shine. "Kissin' in Cars," which was featured on the soundtrack for the film Country Strong, was also co-written by Liles.

Love and Theft made their first Grand Ole Opry performance on March 28, 2009, shortly before the release of the debut single "Runaway." This song was written by Stephen Barker Liles, Canaan Smith, and Rob Blackledge of Blackjack Billy, and is included on the band's debut album, World Wide Open.  The album entered at No. 10 on the Country chart, selling 12,500 copies in its first week. In addition, Love and Theft recorded a video for "Don't Wake Me," another cut from the album. "Runaway" peaked at number 10 on the country chart in November 2009, shortly before Carolwood was consolidated with Lyric Street. "Dancing in Circles" was released as the album's second single in December 2009, and reached a peak of number 25 in March 2010. On April 14, Disney Music Group announced the closure of Lyric Street Records, leaving Love and Theft without a record deal.

Love and Theft became a duo in 2011 when founding member Brian Bandas left the band. The remaining two members then signed with RCA Nashville in 2011. "Angel Eyes" was digitally released on November 8, 2011 and released to radio six days later. In August 2012, "Angel Eyes" became Love and Theft's first Number One single on the Hot Country Songs chart. It was the lead single from their self-titled album, which was released via RCA on July 24, 2012. The album's second and third singles, "Runnin' Out of Air and "If You Ever Get Lonely," were both minor Top 40 hits on the Billboard Country Airplay charts.

The duo released "Night That You'll Never Forget" in early 2014 as the lead single to an upcoming third album. It reached a peak of number 34 on the Billboard Country Airplay charts and in October 2014, it was announced that Love and Theft had parted ways with Sony Music Nashville. Almost an entire second album was lost (including "Going Out Like That," which Reba cut in 2015), the songs untouchable for five years, unless Stephen and Eric paid the hefty price of $13,000 for each song. They self-released "Whiskey on My Breath" via Hate & Purchase Music later in the year, and their third studio album, also titled Whiskey on My Breath, was released on February 10, 2015. Their Can't Wait For the Weekend tour took place 2015-2016, taking place throughout the United States.

In March 2016, Love and Theft signed a new record deal with Curb Records, which immediately re-issued their previous single, "Whiskey on My Breath," to country radio. "Candyland" was released to country radio on October 10, 2016, and will serve as the first single from their forthcoming fourth studio album.

Personal lives
Gunderson married Emily Hagar in 2010. The couple had their first baby on March 10, 2013, a boy named Camden William. Stephen Barker Liles got engaged to Jenna Michelle Kennedy on May 28, 2013. On Dec 2, 2013 they welcomed son Jett Barker Liles. On June 8, 2017 they welcomed their second child a daughter Rayni Bell Liles. Liles and Kennedy married Aug 24, 2014.

Discography

Studio albums

Extended plays

Singles

Music videos

Awards and nominations

References

External links
 Official website

Country music groups from Tennessee
Lyric Street Records artists
Musical groups established in 2006
Country music duos
RCA Records Nashville artists
Musical groups from Nashville, Tennessee